Pat Cashin (1968–2016) was an American professional clown and actor, who owned the rights to the character Captain Kangaroo, with the intention of reviving the show. Cashin was a graduate of the Ringling Brothers and Barnum & Bailey Clown College. In addition to his work as a clown, he also acted (notably in a popular advertisement for Visa), ran the "Clown Alley" blog, and was a very popular mall Santa. 

His premature death in 2016 at 48 effectively ended the proposed revival of the new Captain Kangaroo program, but the character has since been put up for sale by his estate.

External links 
Pat Cashin's Clown Alley
Vows: Terry Williams and Patrick Cashin
"Bring On the Juggling Act" 
RIP Pat Cashin

Notes

American clowns
1968 births
2016 deaths